A pretender is a claimant to an abolished throne or to a throne already occupied by somebody else.

Pretender or The Pretender may also refer to:

Film and television 
 The Pretender (film), a 1947 American crime film
 The Pretender (TV series), a 1996–2000 American television series
 The Pretender 2001, a January 2001 TV movie
 The Pretender: Island of the Haunted, a December 2001 TV movie

 The Pretender (New Zealand TV series) (2005), directed by Jonathan Brough
 "The Pretender" (Code Lyoko), an episode of Code Lyoko

Novels 
 The Pretender (Animorphs), a novel by K. A. Applegate
 The Pretender, a 2008 novel about literary forgery by David Belbin
 Pretender (C. J. Cherryh novel), a 2006 novel set in C. J. Cherryh's Foreigner universe
 The Pretender, a novel by Lion Feuchtwanger
 The Pretender: A Story of the Latin Quarter, a novel by Robert W. Service
 The Pretender: Rebirth, a first of many novels by Steven Long Mitchell & Craig W. Van Sickle based on cult television show The Pretender

Music 
 The Pretender (album), a 1976 album by Jackson Browne
 "The Pretender" (Jackson Browne song), a song from the album
 "The Pretender" (Foo Fighters song), 2007
 "The Pretender", a song by Datarock from Red, 2009
 "Pretender" (Official Hige Dandism song), 2019
 "Pretender" (Lillasyster song), 2021
 "Pretender", a song by Madonna from Like a Virgin, 1984
 "Pretender", a song by Miike Snow from Happy to You, 2012
 "Pretender", a song by Steve Aoki, Lil Yachty, and AJR from Neon Future III, 2018
 "Pretender (acoustic)", acoustic version by AJR from The Click (Deluxe)

Other uses 
 Pretender (horse), a British Thoroughbred racehorse, winner of the 1869 Epsom Derby

See also
 Pretending (disambiguation)
 Pretenders (disambiguation)
 The Great Pretender (disambiguation)
 Antipope, a pretender to the papacy